Hazon is a moshav in the Upper Galilee in northern Israel. Located nine kilometers east of Carmiel, it falls under the jurisdiction of Merom HaGalil Regional Council.

History
The village was founded in 1969 by moshavniks from the Galilee, taking its name from the slopes of Mount Hazon, where it is located. It was established on the land of the
depopulated Palestinian village of Al-Mansura.

References

Moshavim
Populated places in Northern District (Israel)
Populated places established in 1969
1969 establishments in Israel